Girl child labour in Nigeria refers to the high incidence (the occurrence, rate, or frequency of a disease, crime, or something else undesirable) of girls aged 5–14 who are involved in economic activities outside education and leisure. The prevalence of girl child labour in Nigeria is largely due to household wealth, but other factors include: the educational accomplishment of parents, peer pressure and demand factors such as high demand for domestic help and sex workers all contribute to the high incidence of girl child labour in the country. In addition, in many rural and Muslim communities in Northern Nigeria, children are sometimes asked to aid religiously secluded women or mothers in running errands.

Many girls work as help, shop helpers, and street hawkers. The use of young girls in economic activities exposes them to dangers that sometimes result in sexual assault, loneliness, anger, lack of proper parental care, and exploitation. In addition, the workforce of young girls is not recognized by law and any form of employee benefit is negligible.

In Nigeria, child labour is driven by social, demographic, and economic factors such as poverty and loss of employment of parents, loss of a parent or family guardian, rural-urban migration, large family size, and cultural norms such as polygamy. Other drivers include the mal-distribution of schools, poor accessibility, and the high cost of tuition.Recently, conflicts and terrorism have caused internal displacements of people and damage to school facilities, pushing more children into child labour. Moreover, the mass killings of communities by bandits in northern Nigeria have contributed to creating more orphans and potential victims of child labour.

Background
Starting in the mid-1980s, the adverse economic conditions in Nigeria, a country where men constituted the majority of the employees in the formal sector, forced many women to increase their engagement in the informal  but labour-intensive sector so as to supplement household income in addition to working on domestic duties. In Nigeria, strategies undertaken by women in the informal sector include working long hours in the markets and using their children to hawk goods on the streets to reduce the burden. Apart from missing classes, many girls face health and safety risks including exhaustion, attempted sexual assault and kidnapping. Since the beginning of the Structural Adjustment Programme in Nigeria, Nigeria has gone through a period of economic hardship where families have had to improvise new strategies to survive, among which were child trafficking and sending children to the cities as house girls. In 2003, the country enacted the Child Rights Act to protect children from being exploited and denied their rights as minors.

In rural communities, girl child labour is believed to aid girls in developing home skills, helping others, and family solidarity. Activities include gathering firewood. As such socialization is a major reason girls are preferred to boys in the recruitment of maids. However, those types of work do sometimes impede the educational prospect of girls. In some Northern Nigerian Fulani communities, the girl-child helps her mother by hawking milk or other produce from their family farm or made by the mother.

Forms of work

Domestic help
Due to the division of labor according to gender in households and also because of socialization, many Nigerian households prefer to use girls as maids. Domestic help is typically performed by girls aged under 15 who work as maids in the households of families who are in a higher income bracket. In return, the wealthier family pays her or her parents or provides her training in some skill or in very few cases basic education. However, the child may face abuse and sexual assault from the household. In some instances, some of the girls are under the age of 8. In Nigeria, most of the girls are from the Southern and Middle Belt regions. The demand for domestic help in Nigeria and nearby African countries has increased the incidence of child trafficking. This process is enhanced by the invisibility of girls in domestic work because it is considered normal in many urban households.

Organized networks procure child labor in the Southern states including Rivers, Akwa Ibom, Imo, Cross River, Ekiti, and Oyo.  The children are then transported to other states for domestic work.

Street hawking
Many girls below the age of 15 engage in the vending of goods on roads, carriage of goods to customers, and begging for alms. On average, more primary and secondary school-age girls engage in street trading than boys. The young girls choose specific routes and road junctions to vend goods before returning home in the evening. Apart from hawking, some girls also engage in street begging sometimes known as al majeri in the North.

Problems
About 8% of girl hawkers have been subjected to sexual abuse including cases of rape and sexual violence. Young girls are also exposed to adult challenges and deviant behavior at an early age while having no time to attend classes and complete school work.

Apart from exposure to health risks, child abuse, and sexual assault, girl child labor in Nigeria has led to an increase in adolescent-age commercial sex work  exposing the girls to the dangers of street life at an early age. Some young girls are trafficked by organized networks who lie to the girls and their parents that they will be housemaids in the city.

See also 
 Child marriage in Nigeria
 Women in Nigeria

References

Sources

Women in Nigeria
Children's rights in Nigeria
Child labour by country